Caldwell High School is a public high school in Caldwell, Ohio.  It is the only high school in the Caldwell Exempted Village School District.  Their nickname is the Redskins.  They are members of the Ohio Valley Athletic Conference. Their chief sports rivals are the Shenandoah Zeps, the only other high school in the county.

Ohio High School Athletic Association State Championships

 Boys Cross Country – 1973, 1985, 1986, 1987, 1988, 1989, 1990, 1991, 1992

See also
Native American mascot controversy
Sports teams named Redskins

References

External links
 District Website

High schools in Noble County, Ohio
Public high schools in Ohio